Field Marshal William Harcourt, 3rd Earl Harcourt,  (20 March 1743 – 17 June 1830) was a British nobleman and British Army officer. He served as an aide-de-camp to Lord Albemarle for the expedition to Havana during the Seven Years' War. He also commanded his regiment at the Battle of White Plains and then captured General Charles Lee at Basking Ridge during the American Revolutionary War. After that he commanded the British Cavalry at the Battle of Willems during the Flanders Campaign. He succeeded the Duke of York as commander during that campaign and oversaw the British retreat and their final evacuation from Bremen. His last main military role was as Governor of the Royal Military College at Great Marlow.

Military career
Born the younger son of Simon Harcourt, 1st Earl Harcourt and Rebecca Harcourt (née Samborne Le Bas), Harcourt was commissioned as an ensign in the First Regiment of Foot Guards on 10 August 1759. He became a captain in the 16th Light Dragoons, a regiment which had been raised at his father's expense and was known as "Harcourt's Black Horse", on 27 October 1759. He transferred to the 3rd Dragoons on 30 June 1760 and was subsequently sent to Mecklenburg-Strelitz (with his father) to escort the consort-elect of King George III to England. In recognition of this mission he was appointed an equerry to the Queen Consort later that year.

Harcourt served as an aide-de-camp to Lord Albemarle for the expedition to Havana in 1762 during the Seven Years' War. He was promoted to lieutenant colonel and given command of the 31st Regiment of Foot in November 1764, of the 4th Light Dragoons in April 1765 and of the 16th Light Dragoons in June 1768.

In 1766 he was appointed a Groom of the Bedchamber to King George III, a post he held until 1808, when he was made Master of the Robes until 1809, after which he was Master of the Horse to the Queen until 1818. He also sat in Parliament as Member of Parliament for Oxford from 1768 to 1774.

He commanded the 16th Light Dragoons at the Battle of White Plains in October 1776 and then captured General Charles Lee at Basking Ridge in December 1776 during the American Revolutionary War. Promoted to colonel on 29 August 1777, he became aide-de-camp to the King in September 1777 and honorary colonel of the 16th Light Dragoons in October 1779. He bought St Leonard's Hill in Clewer from the Duke of Gloucester in 1781 and, having been promoted to major-general on 20 November 1782, he was then appointed Deputy Ranger of Windsor Great Park.

Promoted to lieutenant-general on 18 October 1793, Harcourt commanded the British Cavalry at the Battle of Willems in May 1794 during the Flanders Campaign. Appointed Governor of Fort William on 21 March 1794, he succeeded the Duke of York as commander during the Flanders Campaign and oversaw the British retreat and their final evacuation from Bremen in Spring 1795. On his return he was appointed Governor of Kingston-upon-Hull.

Harcourt was promoted to full general on 1 January 1798 and he became the first Governor of the Royal Military College at Great Marlow in June 1801. Appointed a Deputy Lieutenant of Berkshire in November 1801, he succeeded his elder brother, George Simon Harcourt, 2nd Earl Harcourt, to the earldom in April 1809 and was appointed Governor of Portsmouth in July 1811. Appointed a Knight Grand Cross of the Order of the Bath on 20 May 1820 and promoted to field marshal on 17 July 1821,  Harcourt bore the Union standard at the coronation of George IV on 19 July 1821. He went on to become Governor of Plymouth in 1827.

Harcourt died at St Leonard's Hill on 17 June 1830 and was buried at Stanton Harcourt in Oxfordshire. The estates passed to a cousin, Edward Vernon, who was Archbishop of York; on inheriting the estates Vernon changed his name to Harcourt. Statues of Lord Harcourt were commissioned from Robert William Sievier and erected at St Michael's Church in Stanton Harcourt and in St George's Chapel, Windsor Castle.

Family
On 3 September 1778 Harcourt married Mary, widow of Thomas Lockhart of Craig House in Scotland, and daughter of the Rev. W. Danby of Farnley in North Yorkshire; they had no children.

References

Sources

External links 
 

1743 births
1830 deaths
Military personnel from Oxfordshire
Burials in Oxfordshire
British field marshals
Earls in the Peerage of Great Britain
Equerries
Governors of the Royal Military College, Sandhurst
Knights Grand Cross of the Order of the Bath
Members of the Parliament of Great Britain for English constituencies
People from Windsor, Berkshire
William
16th The Queen's Lancers officers
British Army personnel of the American Revolutionary War
British MPs 1768–1774
Younger sons of earls